Chrysophyllum splendens is a plant in the family Sapotaceae, native to Brazil.

Description

The timber is locally used in construction and for furniture.

Distribution and habitat
Chrysophyllum splendens is native to the Brazilian states of Bahia, Espírito Santo, Pernambuco.

References

splendens
Flora of Bahia
Flora of Espírito Santo
Flora of Pernambuco
Plants described in 1824